Dreams from the Middle of the World is a 1998 Ecuadorian film directed by Carlos Naranjo Estrella. It was Ecuador's submission to the 73rd Academy Awards for the Academy Award for Best Foreign Language Film, but was not accepted as a nominee.

See also

List of submissions to the 73rd Academy Awards for Best Foreign Language Film

References

External links

1998 films
1998 drama films
1990s Spanish-language films
Ecuadorian drama films